= Thermacell Repellents =

Consumer mosquito and tick repellent devices

Thermacell Repellents, Inc.
- Type: Private
- Industry: Consumer products
- Founded: 1981
- Founder: William "Bill" Schawbel
- Headquarters: Bedford, Massachusetts, United States
- Products: Mosquito and tick repellent devices
- Website: www.thermacell.com

Thermacell Repellents, Inc. is a United States–based consumer products company that develops mosquito and tick repellent devices. The company is headquartered in Bedford, Massachusetts and distributes its products in more than 30 countries worldwide .

== History ==
Thermacell traces its origins to entrepreneur William "Bill" Schawbel, a former Gillette executive who founded the Schawbel Corporation in 1981. The company initially produced portable consumer products before expanding into insect repellent technologies in the late 1990s.

In July 2014, private equity firm Kinderhook Industries acquired the Thermacell mosquito repellent business from Schawbel Corporation, with the heated insoles operations reorganized separately as Schawbel Technologies LLC. The transaction was supported by $21 million in secured financing from TCF Capital Funding. In 2019, global private equity firm TA Associates acquired a majority stake in Thermacell from Kinderhook, and exited the investment in 2022.

According to a 2023 feature in The Bedford Citizen, Thermacell's Bedford, Massachusetts workforce grew from approximately 40 to roughly 135 employees following the company's expansion into mosquito repellent products.

== Products ==
Thermacell produces portable and fixed-location mosquito repellent systems that use heat to disperse synthetic pyrethroid repellents, including allethrin and metofluthrin, creating a localized area of protection against mosquitoes and other biting insects.

The product line includes fuel-powered portable devices, rechargeable battery-powered units, and installed outdoor systems. In 2022, Thermacell introduced the LIV Smart Mosquito Repellent System, a permanently installed system designed for residential outdoor spaces with smart-home integration. Selected products are registered with the U.S. Environmental Protection Agency.

== Reception ==
=== Consumer reviews ===
The New York Times Wirecutter has named the Thermacell E90 its top overall pick in its mosquito-control gear guide, with the EX90 also recommended and the LIV system listed as an "Upgrade Pick"; the guide cites consultations with the American Mosquito Control Association and a Texas A&M entomologist. CNN Underscored published a hands-on review of the E55 rechargeable repeller that included commentary from a University of Georgia entomologist and a University of Florida extension specialist. A review in WIRED described the LIV system as an alternative to traditional mosquito control methods, citing its design and effectiveness in certain outdoor environments while noting cost and installation complexity as drawbacks. Reviews have also appeared in Bob Vila, Reviewed (USA Today network), Family Handyman, and Business Insider, generally noting ease of use compared with topical repellents while highlighting reduced performance in windy conditions and ongoing refill costs.

=== Scientific and field evaluations ===
Thermacell devices have been the subject of independent peer-reviewed research. A 2003 field evaluation in the Journal of Medical Entomology tested a Thermacell area-repellent system against Phlebotomus papatasi sand flies in a leishmaniasis-endemic region of Turkey, reporting biting reductions exceeding 90% over a six-hour period. A 2009 review in the Journal of Vector Ecology on the U.S. military's role in vector-control product development identified Thermacell as a novel spatial repellent technology and cited the Turkey field trial. A 2013 evaluation by the U.S. Navy Entomology Center of Excellence assessed Thermacell among commercial spatial repellents for use in deployment settings against Aedes albopictus. A 2016 study in the Journal of Medical Entomology tested Thermacell and a comparable clip-on device for repellency and mortality against Amblyomma americanum (lone star ticks). A 2023 experimental-hut and field evaluation in western Kenya, published in Malaria Journal, tested a Thermacell-manufactured metofluthrin emanator against pyrethroid-resistant Anopheles funestus mosquitoes.

A 2024 study in the Journal of Insect Science, conducted by Virginia Tech researchers with funding from Thermacell, examined whether airborne metofluthrin from a Thermacell device affected foraging honey bees and reported no significant impact on bee foraging behavior.

== Operations ==
Thermacell is headquartered in Bedford, Massachusetts, and operates manufacturing and distribution facilities in the United States. In 2025, the company completed a $4 million expansion in Buford, Georgia, opening a 256,000-square-foot manufacturing and distribution facility.

== Recognition ==
The Thermacell LIV Smart Mosquito Repellent System was included in TIME's "Best Inventions of 2022".
